Kumari Kamala (born 16 June 1934) is an Indian dancer and actress (also known as Kamala Lakshman). Initially featured as a child dancer, Kamala appeared in almost 100 Tamil, Hindi, Telugu and Kannada films throughout her career. In the 1970s, she became a teacher of the Vazhuvoor style of dance in which she specialises.

Early life and career 
She was born at Mayuram, India, and belongs to Tamil brahmin community. Her sisters Rhadha and Vasanti are also dancers. At an early age Kamala began taking lessons in the Kathak dance style from Lachhu Maharaj in Bombay. She also took lessons in Hindustani classical music from Shankar Rao Vyas. She was discovered at age four by Tamil film director A.N. Kalyanasundaram Iyer when he attended a dance recital. He cast her in small roles in his films Valibar Sangham (1938) and Ramanama Mahimai (1939) where she was billed as Kamala. Her dancing was noticed by other filmmakers and she moved to Hindi films with Jailor in 1938 and Kismet and Ram Rajya in 1943. Kamala's mother moved to Madras so her daughter could train under the Bharatanatyam teachers Kattumannarkoil Muthukumara Pillai and Vazhuvoor B. Ramaiyah Pillai. Kamala's first role in a successful Tamil film came in 1944 with Jagathalapratapan where she performed the Paampu attam. Kamala played a double role in her next film Sri Valli (1945) and also played Krishna in the film Meera. However, it was her film Nam Iruvar that would make an impact on Tamil cinema. Nam Iruvar was full of patriotism and Gandhian songs, and its dances helped to revitalize and legitimize Bharatanatyam. The film is credited with sparking a "cultural revolution" throughout the Tamil speaking areas of India.

In 1953, Kamala was invited to perform for Queen Elizabeth II during her coronation festivities. In the late 1950s she toured internationally, performing in China and Japan. In 1970, the government of India awarded her the Padma Bhushan, India's third highest civilian award. She also taught dance for two terms at Colgate University after being awarded its Branta Professorship in 1975. In 1980, Kamala moved to New York City permanently and began teaching classical dance. She established a dance school in Long Island, Shri Bharatha Kamalalaya. In 2010 she received a National Heritage Fellowship from the National Endowment for the Arts for her contributions to the arts.

Personal life 
Kamala married twice. Her first husband was the cartoonist R. K. Laxman. The marriage ended in divorce in 1960. 

This was one of the earliest divorces among the Hindu community in India, where divorce was simply not available for Hindus until 1956. The years of this marriage were the years when Kamala attained fame, and she was known as "Kamala Laxman". This later became a cause for confusion, because R.K. Laxman's second wife was also named Kamala Laxman. To reduce the confusion, Kamala took the new name "Kamala Kumari" in later life. Kamala later married again, in defiance of Hindu religious practice. Little is known of Kamala's second husband, T. V. Lakshminarayanan, who died in 1983.

The second marriage produced one child, a son named Jainand Narayan, who is an officer in the United States Army.

Awards 

1967 - Kalaimamani
1968 - Central Sangeet Natak Akademi Award
1970 - Padma Bhushan
1975 - Branta Professorship from Colgate University
1989 - E. Krishna Iyer Medal from the Sruti Foundation
1993 - Sangeeta Ratnakara at the Cleveland Thyagaraja Aradhana
2002 - Platinum Jubilee award from Madras Music Academy
2010 - National Heritage Fellowship
2012 - Soorya Lifetime Achievement Award in 4th St. Louis Indian Dance Festival

Partial filmography 

1938 Valibar Sangham
1938 Jailor
1939 Ramanama Mahimai
1941 Kanjan
1942 Chandni
1943 Kismet
1943 Ram Rajya
1944 Jagathalapratapan
1945 Sri Valli
1945 Meera
1945 En Magan
1947 Ekambavanan
1947 Katagam
1947 Mahathma Udangar
1947 Nam Iruvar
1948 Vedhala Ulagam
1950 Vijayakumari
1950 Digambara Samiyar
1951 Lavanya
1951 Devaki
1951 Mohana Sundaram
1952 Parasakthi
1953 Manithan
1953 Ulagam
1954 Vilayattu Bommai
1956 Devta
1956 Naane Raja
1956 Chori Chori
1956 Kula Dheivam
1956 Charana Daasi
1957 Kathputli
1958 Bhookailas
1958 Thirumanam
1958 Illarame Nallaram
1958 Yahudi
1959 Sivagangai Seemai
1959 Naach Ghar
1959 Naya Sansar
1960 Parthiban Kanavu
1960 Paavai Vilakku
1960 Veerakkanal
1961 Bhakta Kuchela
1961 Saugandh
1962 Konjum Salangai
1962 Sumaithaangi
1971 Jwala
1973 Chenda

References

External links 
 Official Website
 "FRAGRANT PETALS-Kamala's Natyam" - a 3 episode video series on Kamala by her student Ramaa Bharadvaj
 

Performers of Indian classical dance
1934 births
Living people
National Heritage Fellowship winners
Recipients of the Padma Bhushan in arts
People from Mayiladuthurai district
Indian female classical dancers
20th-century Indian dancers
20th-century Indian women artists
Women artists from Tamil Nadu
Dancers from Tamil Nadu
Recipients of the Sangeet Natak Akademi Award
Bharatanatyam exponents